Mango is a Lolo-Burmese language spoken by just under 50 people in Guangnan County, Yunnan, China.

Mango is spoken in the two villages of Mumei 木美 and Zhelai 者赖, both located in Babao Town 八宝镇.

References

Mondzish languages
Languages of China